Ed Newton (nicknamed "Newt") is an American custom car builder.

Newton designed the Panthermobile (with Bill "Leadslinger" Hines and Joe Baillon), as well as "Big Daddy" Roth's customs Orbitron and Surfite, among others.

Notes

Sources
News.com.au (retrieved 15 January 2017)
 (retrieved 06 June 2021)

American automobile designers
Kustom Kulture
Living people
Year of birth missing (living people)